Richard Paul "Rick" Wowchuk is a Canadian politician and member of the Legislative Assembly of Manitoba, representing the electoral district of Swan River as a member of the Progressive Conservative Party of Manitoba. He was first elected in the 2016 provincial election, and re-elected in 2019.

During the 2019 election campaign, Wowchuk came under scrutiny after it was revealed he was under sexual harassment allegations from his former constituency office assistant. It was reported Wowchuk violated workplace policy on five occasions. The allegations did not affect Wowchuk at the polls; he was allowed to remain in the PC Caucus and was re-elected in his riding by a large margin.

References 

21st-century Canadian politicians
Living people
Progressive Conservative Party of Manitoba MLAs
1958 births